Rara Avis is a ghost town located in Itawamba County, Mississippi, approximately  west of the Alabama state line.

Rara Avis was settled in 1850, and the town name translated to Latin means "rare bird".

The population was 100 in 1900.  A post office was established in 1902.

Author and Baptist missionary James Garvin Chastain Sr., was born in Rara Avis in 1853.

References

External links
 Photo of Rara Avis welcome sign

Former populated places in Itawamba County, Mississippi
Former populated places in Mississippi